The SPFL Reserve League is the reserve team league for football in Scotland. The league began in 2018, as the SPFL Development League was replaced by a reserve team (i.e not age-restricted) format.

History
In its first season, 2018–19, the league included 27 clubs, split into two divisions. At its end, several clubs (Aberdeen, Celtic, Hibernian, Rangers and St Johnstone) intimated that they would withdraw from the Reserve League to arrange their own programme of matches. The 2019–20 edition was formed with 19 clubs, with the season being curtailed early due to the COVID-19 pandemic in Scotland; the winners were decided on a 'points per game' calculation. 

After a two-year hiatus due to the pandemic, the league will return in season 2022–23 with ten clubs participating.

Participating clubs

 Ayr United 
 Dundee 
 Dundee United
 Hamilton Academical 
 Hibernian
 Kilmarnock 
 Livingston 
 Motherwell 
 Queen of the South
 Queen’s Park

Winners

Reserve Cup
A knockout competition is organised alongside the League.

See also 
Scottish Premier Reserve League (a similar competition, operated by the Scottish Premier League between 1998 and 2009)

References

External links
2019–20 season at Soccerway
Table and fixtures at SPFL

Reserve League
2018 establishments in Scotland
Scotland